Juan Carlos Rodríguez Belencoso (born 1 September 1981) is a Spanish footballer who plays for FC La Unión Atlético as a forward.

Club career
Born in Elche de la Sierra, Albacete, Belencoso started playing as a senior with amateurs Deportivo Rayo Cantabria. From 2002 to 2008, following a brief spell in Portugal, he competed mainly in the Segunda División B, representing at that level Real Jaén, Mérida UD, CE L'Hospitalet and CD Baza.

Aged 27, Belencoso reached Segunda División for the first time in the 2008–09 season, signing with local Castile-La Mancha club Albacete Balompié. He made his debut in the competition on 31 August 2008, coming in as a late substitute in a 2–1 home win against Sevilla Atlético, but only scored twice in the league over the course of two full seasons.

Belencoso returned to division three for the following years, playing with UB Conquense, CD Lugo and Cádiz CF. He achieved promotion with the second team after scoring 14 goals, three in the playoffs.

On 9 July 2013, Belencoso became coach Àlex Gómez's first foreign signing of the new campaign as he joined Kitchee SC in Hong Kong. He made an impressive start to his First Division League adventure, netting twice and providing two assists in a 6–2 victory over Sun Hei SC on 3 September.

Club statistics

References

External links

1981 births
Living people
Spanish footballers
Footballers from Castilla–La Mancha
Association football forwards
Segunda División players
Segunda División B players
Tercera División players
Tercera Federación players
Deportivo Rayo Cantabria players
Real Jaén footballers
Mérida UD footballers
CE L'Hospitalet players
Real Balompédica Linense footballers
Albacete Balompié players
UB Conquense footballers
CD Lugo players
Cádiz CF players
Mar Menor FC players
UD Socuéllamos players
CF Villanovense players
Liga Portugal 2 players
G.D. Chaves players
Hong Kong First Division League players
Kitchee SC players
Indonesian Premier League players
Persib Bandung players
Indian Super League players
ATK (football club) players
Spanish expatriate footballers
Expatriate footballers in Portugal
Expatriate footballers in Hong Kong
Expatriate footballers in Indonesia
Expatriate footballers in India
Spanish expatriate sportspeople in Portugal
Spanish expatriate sportspeople in Hong Kong
Spanish expatriate sportspeople in Indonesia
Spanish expatriate sportspeople in India